This a list of films produced in the Malayalam cinema and language in the 2000s.

 List of Malayalam films of 2000
 List of Malayalam films of 2001
 List of Malayalam films of 2002
 List of Malayalam films of 2003
 List of Malayalam films of 2004
 List of Malayalam films of 2005
 List of Malayalam films of 2006
 List of Malayalam films of 2007
 List of Malayalam films of 2008
 List of Malayalam films of 2009

See also
List of Malayalam films of the 1990s
List of Malayalam films of the 2010s
List of highest-grossing Malayalam films

External links 

2000s
Lists of 2000s films
Malayalam